Santiago Luis Sasiaín González (born May 28, 1996) is a Paraguayan athlete who holds the record of Hammer throw with 56.58 m. (7.26 kg). He plays with the athletics club Sol de América.

References

External links
IAAF Profile

1996 births
Living people
Place of birth missing (living people)
Paraguayan male athletes
 
21st-century Paraguayan people